The Park Theatre (est.1879) was a playhouse in Boston, Massachusetts, in the late 19th and early 20th centuries. It later became the State cinema. Located on Washington Street, near Boylston Street, the building existed until 1990.

History 
In 1879 Henry E. Abbey, proprietor of Abbey's Park Theatre in New York, opened Boston's Park Theatre. Abbey was one half of the theatrical management firm  Abbey and Schoeffel, along with his backer John B. Schoeffel. Schoeffel was assistant manager.

It occupied the building of the former Beethoven Hall, "reconstructed and practically rebuilt;" its 1,184-seat auditorium was "60 feet wide, 63 from the state to the doors, and 50 feet high." The architect of the rebuilt theatre was Abel C. Martin. It sat on Washington Street at the corner of Boylston Street in today's Chinatown/Theatre district.

In the 1890s it presented "farcical comedy." Managers and proprietors included Henry E. Abbey; Jack A. Crabtree; Lotta Crabtree; Charles Frohman, Rich & Harris; Lawrence McCarty; John B. Schoeffel (Abbey, Schoeffel and Grau); John Stetson Jr.; and Eugene Tompkins.

Louis Baer led the 11-piece orchestra in the 1890s.

In the 20th century the building became "Minsky's Park Burlesque," the "Hub," "Trans-Lux," and then "The State" cinema. The building survived until its razing in 1990.

Images

Performances

1870s–1880s 
 Fedora, with Fanny Davenport and Robert Mantell
 Gunter's Prince Karl
 Andrea
 Gretchen
 Fun in a Photograph Gallery

1890s 
 James A. Herne's Sag Harbor
 Merchant of Venice, with Sidney Woollett
 1492
 C.A. Byrne and Louis Harrison's Venus
 Trilby
 Lost, Strayed or Stolen
 Dumas' Clemenceau Case''.

1900s 
 Choir Invisible
 Henry Arthur Jones' The Hypocrites
 R.A. Barnet's Cap of Fortune and the Show Girl
Fay Davis Whitewashing Julia

1910s 
 The Dancing Girl
 The Girl of the Golden West
 Maternity, starring Alice Brady
 The Soul of a Magdalen, starring Olga Petrova

1920s 
 On with the Dance
 Robin Hood

References

External links 

 Historic New England. Sidewalk at Park Theatre, 619 Washington St., photo
 Library of Congress. Drawing of Park Theatre by Anthony F. Dumas, 1929
 Boston Athenaeum. Park Theatre Programs, 1879–1898.
 Flickr. Photo of the State theatre, 1984

Cultural history of Boston
19th century in Boston
20th century in Boston
Boston Theater District
1879 establishments in Massachusetts
Former theatres in Boston
Event venues established in 1879
Former cinemas in the United States